Garuki may refer to:
 Garuki, Iranshahr, Sistan and Baluchestan Province